City of Edinburgh B.C. is an amateur basketball club based in the Portobello area of Edinburgh, Scotland.  

The Kings (Men) and Kool Kats (Women) both compete in their respective Division 1s of the Scottish Basketball Championship, the national basketball league of Scotland.

Awards
In 2007, the City of Edinburgh Basketball Club Committee was awarded the Chairman's Award by basketballscotland.  The award was given at the 2007 Volunteer Awards held in Perth, Scotland.

The club also picked up four Scottish Cups in 2007: Cadet Women, Junior Men, Junior Women, and Senior Men.

Kings (Men)

Honours

Season-by-season records

Record in BBL competitions

Kool Kats (Women)

Honours

References

External links

1988 establishments in Scotland
Basketball teams established in 1988
Basketball teams in Scotland
Sports teams in Edinburgh